Denmark sent a delegation to compete at the 1976 Summer Paralympics in Toronto, Ontario, Canada. Its athletes finished twenty fourth in the overall medal count.

Medallists

See also 
 1976 Summer Paralympics
 Denmark at the 1976 Summer Olympics

References 

Nations at the 1976 Summer Paralympics
1976
Summer Paralympics